Newry River and River Clanrye (Ulster-Scots: Clanrye Wattèr) are names for one of the rivers of Ireland. The river passes through the city of Newry and empties into Carlingford Lough near Warrenpoint.

Course
The river, which runs through Newry, forms the historic border between County Armagh and County Down. Some maps call the portion downstream from Newry to the Lough the 'Newry River' and the portion upstream of Newry the 'Clanrye' (as it curls around to its sources in the foothills of the Mourne Mountains in Ulster), but not all sources make this distinction. According to local tradition, however, the entire waterway is known as the Clanrye.

While the Newry River flows under the Newry Town Hall, according to the Ordnance Survey of Northern Ireland, the Clanrye breaks away from the Newry River near Drummillar. The Clanrye then progresses under the main Belfast to Dublin A1 road at Sheepbridge and onward toward the Mayobridge Road at the Crown Bridges and Ashtree Cottages. 

Beyond Newry, the river flows south east, past Narrow Water Castle, where it enters Carlingford Lough at Warrenpoint.

Names

Clanrye River

The word 'Clanrye' comes from the Irish An Gleann Rí meaning The King's Valley.

Newry River and Saint Patrick 

During one of Saint Patrick's exploratory missions to Ireland he was said to have set up camp on a sandy stretch of the Clanrye River. Whilst settling himself there he took the decision to plant a yew tree symbolising Ireland's growing and strengthening faith. It is this story which gave Newry its name, Iúr Cinn Trá: the yew tree at the head of the strand (although this part of the riverbank does not resemble a beach today). A monastery, later replaced in 1144 by a Cistercian Abbey,  grew up around this yew, with the associated city, An nIúr (simply 'The Yew Tree'), and by anglicisation, Newry, arising around the monastery, and the river, thereafter. An image of a seated St Patrick beside a yew tree by the Clanrye River remains the crest of several local organisations including Newry City A.F.C. and the local Newry Reporter newspaper.

See also
List of rivers of Northern Ireland

References

Rivers of County Down
Newry